David Raymond Sedaris (born December 26, 1956) is an American humorist, comedian, author, and radio contributor. He was publicly recognized in 1992 when National Public Radio broadcast his essay "Santaland Diaries.” He published his first collection of essays and short stories, Barrel Fever, in 1994. His next book, Naked (1997), became his first of a series of New York Times Bestsellers, and his 2000 collection Me Talk Pretty One Day won the Thurber Prize for American Humor.

Much of Sedaris's humor is ostensibly autobiographical and self-deprecating and often concerns his family life, his middle-class upbringing in the suburbs of Raleigh, North Carolina, his Greek heritage, homosexuality, jobs, education, drug use, and obsessive behaviors, as well as his life in France, London, New York, and the South Downs in England. He is the brother and writing collaborator of actress Amy Sedaris.

In 2019, Sedaris was elected to the American Academy of Arts and Letters.

Early life and education 
Sedaris was born in Johnson City, New York to Sharon Elizabeth (née Leonard) and Louis Harry "Lou" Sedaris (1923–2021), an IBM engineer. His mother was Anglo-American. His father was born in the U.S. to immigrants from Apidea in Greece. His mother was Protestant, and his father was Greek Orthodox, which was the faith in which David was raised.

The Sedaris family moved when David was young, and he grew up in a suburban area of Raleigh, the second oldest child of six. His siblings, from oldest to youngest, are Lisa, Gretchen, Amy, Tiffany, and Paul ("the Rooster"). Tiffany died by suicide in 2013, a subject David deals with in the essay "Now We Are Five", which was published in The New Yorker.

After graduating from Jesse O. Sanderson High School in Raleigh, Sedaris briefly attended Western Carolina University before transferring to and dropping out of Kent State University in 1977. In his teens and twenties, David dabbled in visual and performance art. He describes his lack of success in several of his essays.

He moved to Chicago in 1983 and graduated from the School of the Art Institute of Chicago in 1987. (He did not attend Princeton University, although he spoke fondly of doing so in "What I Learned", a comic baccalaureate address delivered at Princeton in June 2006).

Career 
While working odd jobs in Raleigh, Chicago, and New York City, Sedaris was discovered in a Chicago club by radio host Ira Glass. Sedaris was reading a diary he had kept since 1977. Impressed with his work, Glass asked him to appear on his weekly local program, The Wild Room. Referring to the opportunity, Sedaris said, "I owe everything to Ira... My life just changed completely, like someone waved a magic wand." Sedaris's success on The Wild Room led to his National Public Radio debut on December 23, 1992, when he read a radio essay on Morning Edition titled "Santaland Diaries,” which described his purported experiences as an elf at Macy's department store during Christmas in New York.

"Santaland Diaries" was a success with listeners and made Sedaris what The New York Times called "a minor phenomenon.” He began recording a monthly segment for NPR, which was based on his diary entries and was edited and produced by Glass, and he also signed a two book deal with Little, Brown and Company. In 1993, Sedaris told The New York Times he was publishing his first book, a collection of stories and essays, and he had 70 pages written of his second book, a novel "about a man who keeps a diary and whom Mr. Sedaris described as 'not me, but a lot like me'."

Collections and mainstream success 
In 1994, Sedaris published Barrel Fever, a collection of stories and essays. He became a frequent contributor when Ira Glass began a weekly hour-long PRI/Chicago Public Radio show, This American Life, in 1995. Sedaris began writing essays for Esquire and The New Yorker. In 1997, he published another collection of essays, Naked, which won the Randy Shilts Award for Gay Non-Fiction from Publishing Triangle in 1998.

Naked and his subsequent four essay collections, Holidays on Ice (1997), Me Talk Pretty One Day (2000), Dress Your Family in Corduroy and Denim (2004), and When You Are Engulfed in Flames (2008), became New York Times Best Sellers.

Me Talk Pretty One Day was written mostly in France, over seven months, and it was published in 2000 to "practically unanimous rave reviews." For that book, Sedaris won the 2001 Thurber Prize for American Humor.

In April 2001, Variety reported Sedaris had sold the Me Talk Pretty One Day film rights to director Wayne Wang, who was adapting four stories from the book for Columbia Pictures. Wang had completed the script and begun casting when Sedaris asked to "get out of it,” after he and his sister worried how their family might be portrayed. He wrote about the conversation and its aftermath in the essay "Repeat After Me.” Sedaris recounted that Wang was "a real prince... I didn't want him to be mad at me, but he was so grown up about it. I never saw how it could be turned into a movie anyway."

In 2004, Sedaris published Dress Your Family in Corduroy and Denim, which reached number 1 on The New York Times Nonfiction Best Seller List in June of that year. The audiobook of Dress Your Family, read by Sedaris, was nominated for a Grammy Award for Best Spoken Word Album.  The same year, Sedaris was nominated for a Grammy Award for Best Comedy Album for his recording Live at Carnegie Hall. In March 2006, Ira Glass said that Sedaris's next book would be a collection of animal fables; during that year, Sedaris included several animal fables in his US book tour, and three of his fables were broadcast on This American Life.

In September 2007, a new Sedaris collection was announced for publication the following year. The collection's working title was All the Beauty You Will Ever Need, but Sedaris retitled it Indefinite Leave to Remain and finally settled on the title When You Are Engulfed in Flames. Although at least one news source assumed the book would be fables, Sedaris said in October 2007 that the collection might include a "surprisingly brief story about [his] decision to quit smoking,” along with other stories about various topics, including chimpanzees at a typing school, and people visiting [him] in France. The book was described as his darkest as, it dealt with themes of death and dying.

In December 2008, Sedaris received an honorary doctorate from Binghamton University.

In April 2010, BBC Radio 4 aired Meet David Sedaris, a four-part series of essays, which Sedaris read before a live audience. A second series of six programs began airing on BBC Radio 4 Extra in June 2011, with a third series beginning in September 2012. In July 2017, the sixth series was aired on BBC Radio 4 Extra. In 2010, he released a collection of stories, Squirrel Seeks Chipmunk: A Modest Bestiary. Sedaris released a collection of essays, Let's Explore Diabetes with Owls, in 2013 and, in 2017, published a collection of his 1977–2002 diaries, Theft By Finding. Also in 2013, the film adaptation of an essay from Naked was released as a feature-length movie, C.O.G.

In July 2011, Sedaris's essay "Chicken Toenails, Anyone", published in The Guardian, garnered some criticism over concerns that it was insensitive towards China and Chinese culture.

A frequent guest of late-night US talk show host Craig Ferguson, in April 2012, Sedaris joined Ferguson and the cast of CBS's The Late, Late Show in Scotland for a theme week filmed in and around Cumbernauld and in Edinburgh. The five weeknight episodes aired in May 2012.

Sedaris's ninth book, Let's Explore Diabetes with Owls, was released in April 2013.

In 2014, he participated in Do I Sound Gay?, a documentary film by David Thorpe about stereotypes of gay men's speech patterns.

He appeared along with his sister Amy as special guest judges on season 8, episode 8, of RuPaul's Drag Race. He also appeared as a guest in the Adult Swim television series FishCenter Live.

Sedaris guest starred on the Netflix animated comedy-drama series BoJack Horseman as the mother of Princess Carolyn, voiced by Amy Sedaris.

In 2019, Sedaris was elected to the American Academy of Arts and Letters.

In 2022, he published Happy Go Lucky, where he reflected on his relationship with his recently deceased father.

Truth of nonfiction work 
In 2007, in an article in The New Republic, Alexander S. Heard stated that much of Sedaris's work is insufficiently factual to justify being marketed as nonfiction. Several published responses to Heard's article argued that Sedaris's readers are aware that his descriptions and stories are intentionally exaggerated and manipulated to maximize comic effect, while others used the controversy as a springboard for discussing the liberties publishers are willing to take when calling books "nonfiction".

Subsequently, in the wake of a controversy involving Mike Daisey's dramatizing and embellishing his personal experiences at Chinese factories, during an excerpt from his theatrical monologue for This American Life, new attention has been paid to the veracity of Sedaris's nonfiction stories. NPR labels stories from Sedaris, such as "Santaland Diaries", as fiction, while This American Life fact checks stories, to the extent that memories and long-ago conversations can be checked. The New Yorker already subjects nonfiction stories written for that magazine to its comprehensive fact-checking policy.

The Talent Family 
Sedaris has written several plays with his sister, actress Amy Sedaris, under the name "The Talent Family". These include Stump the Host (1993), Stitches (1994), One Woman Shoe, which co-starred David Rakoff (1995) and The Little Frieda Mysteries (1997). All were produced and presented by Meryl Vladimer while she was the artistic director of "the CLUB" at La MaMa, E.T.C. The Book of Liz (2001) was written by Sedaris and his sister, Amy and produced by Drama Dept. at The Greenwich Theater in New York.

The New Yorker 
Sedaris has contributed over 40 essays to The New Yorker magazine and blog.

Personal life 
, Sedaris lives in Rackham, West Sussex, England with his longtime partner, painter and set designer Hugh Hamrick. Sedaris mentions Hamrick in a number of his stories, and describes the two of them as the "sort of couple who wouldn't get married."

Sedaris is known to regularly wear a headlamp at night and spend hours removing litter from roads and highways near Rackham. Because of this hobby he is known locally as "Pig Pen" and has a waste vehicle named after him.

Bibliography

Story and essay collections
 
 
 
 
 
 Children Playing Before a Statue of Hercules (editor, 2005)
 When You Are Engulfed in Flames (2008)
 Squirrel Seeks Chipmunk: A Modest Bestiary (2010)
 Let's Explore Diabetes With Owls (April 2013)
 Theft by Finding: Diaries (1977–2002) (May 2017)
 Calypso (May 2018)
 The Best of Me (November 2020)
 A Carnival of Snackery: Diaries (2003–2020) (October 2021)
 Happy-Go-Lucky (May 2022)

Articles
 "Old Faithful"
 "What I Learned" (delivered at Princeton in June 2006), a comic baccalaureate address 
 "Dentists Without Borders", a humorous essay on socialized medicine in France
 "I Brake for Traditional Marriage" (2010), a heterosexual perspective of California's repeal of Proposition 8
 "The Poo Corner" (2005), a piece addressing public defecation in department stores, hotels, and college dorm washing machines

Plays 
 "One-Woman Shoe," by David Sedaris and Amy Sedaris (1995)
  Santaland Diaries and Seasons Greetings (1998)
 The Book of Liz: A Play by David Sedaris and Amy Sedaris (2002)

Audio recordings
 Barrel Fever and Other Stories (1994)
 Naked (1997)
 Holidays on Ice (1998)
 Me Talk Pretty One Day (2001)
 The David Sedaris Box Set (2002)
 Live at Carnegie Hall (2003)
 Dress Your Family in Corduroy and Denim (2004)
 When You Are Engulfed in Flames (2008)
 Live for Your Listening Pleasure (2009)
 Squirrel Seeks Chipmunk: A Modest Bestiary (2010)
 Let's Explore Diabetes with Owls (2013)
 Theft by Finding: Diaries (1977-2002) (2017)
 Calypso (May 2018)
 Themes and Variations - An Essay (April 2020)
 Happy-Go-Lucky (May 2022)

References

External links 

Biography at David Sedaris Books
NPR archive of selected Sedaris appearances
Interview with David Sedaris by Wim Brands, filmed summer 2013 at Sedaris's West Sussex home. 25-minute interview in English with Dutch subtitles, discussing his writing methods.
, the opening chapter from Me Talk Pretty One Day
Nikki Tundel, "A conversation with humorist David Sedaris", an interview with David Sedaris on Minnesota Public Radio, June 14, 2008
"David Sedaris reads from and discusses When You're Engulfed in Flames" – Live from the Tattered Cover bookstore in Denver, Colorado
The MoJo Interview: David Sedaris by Tony DuShane, Mother Jones, July/August 2008

David Sedaris Papers. General Collection, Beinecke Rare Book and Manuscript Library, Yale University.

1956 births
21st-century American comedians
American atheists
American essayists
American expatriates in England
American expatriates in France
American humorists
American male comedians
American male essayists
American people of English descent
American writers of Greek descent
American gay writers
Greek Orthodox Christians from the United States
Jesse O. Sanderson High School alumni
Lambda Literary Award winners
Gay comedians
LGBT people from New York (state)
LGBT people from North Carolina
Living people
People from Endicott, New York
People from Johnson City, New York
People from Parham, West Sussex
School of the Art Institute of Chicago alumni
The New Yorker people
This American Life people
Writers from Binghamton, New York
Writers from Raleigh, North Carolina
Members of the American Academy of Arts and Letters